Christ – The Album is the fourth album by Crass, released in 1982. It was released as a boxed-set, double-vinyl LP package, including one disc of new studio material and another, entitled Well Forked.. But Not Dead, a live recording of the band's June 1981 gig at the 100 Club in London along with other studio tracks, demos and tape fragments. The box also included a book, A Series of Shock Slogans and Mindless Token Tantrums (featuring Penny Rimbaud's essay "The Last of the Hippies", telling the story of the suspicious death of his friend Wally Hope), and a large poster painted by Gee Vaucher. The album was well received and the band considered it their best.

In 2011, a two-disc remastered CD edition of the album was released as a part of the band's Crassical Collection reissue series. This edition featured extra content, with the studio album (and the bonus tracks) featured on the first disc and the live album featured on the second disc. On 2 October 2020, the Crassical Collection edition was reissued, with the bonus tracks added to the second disc.

Background and release
Unlike previous Crass albums, Christ took almost a year to record, produce and mix, during which time the Falklands War had taken place. This caused Crass to fundamentally question their approach to making records. As a group whose very reason for existing was to comment on political issues, they felt that they had been overtaken and made to appear redundant by real-world events.

For subsequent releases, including the singles "How Does It Feel to Be the Mother of a Thousand Dead", "Sheep Farming in the Falklands" and the album Yes Sir, I Will, the band stripped their sound "back to basics", issuing the singles as "tactical responses" to political situations.

Rereleases of the album bear the line "With love to Steve Herman who died on the 4th of February 1989" on the back cover. Herman was Crass' guitar player during their first few months.

Reception

Christ – The Album is considered by former members of Crass to be among their best recordings. In a retrospective article written for the album, Harry Sword of The Quietus refers to it as "the most caustic realization of their vision" and called it "a seething howl that remains most intensely relevant to politics and vibrantly forward thinking in terms of music." Trouser Press referred to it as "quintessential" for it "proves the band's courage and conviction."

Reviewing the album in NME, Paul Du Noyer wrote: "There's always something exciting about such raw passion; anger which hits you so hard that every idea in your head gets shook up, violently."

Track listing

Personnel
Joy De Vivre - vocals
Steve Ignorant - vocals
Peeve Libido (Eve Libertine) - vocals
Phil Free - synthesizer, guitar
$ri Hari Nana B.A. (N.A.Palmer) - rhythm sitar
Sybil Right (Pete Wright) - bass guitar
Paul Ellis - strings
Elvis Rimbaud (Penny Rimbaud) - drums, radio
Steve Herman - guitar (on the two demos on 'Well Forked')
Jean Paul Marat - liner notes

References

Crass albums
1982 albums
Crass Records albums